A referendum on maintaining the monarchy was held in Greece on 1 September 1946. The proposal was approved by 68.4% of voters with a turnout of 88.6%.

Background

The referendum was the fourth since 1920 on the country's monarchy. The 1946 parliamentary elections, in which the right-wing parties achieved a landslide, had just taken place. The new conservative government of Konstantinos Tsaldaris was favorable to George II, but what influenced the result more was the atmosphere of imminent civil war.

The civil war convulsed Greece during two main periods: first between 1943 and 1944 between the KKE-dominated EAM/ELAS partisans and the right-wing resistance groups and the internationally recognized Greek government-in-exile which had returned to the country in November 1944 and later in 1946–1949. The collaborationist government had collapsed after the Germans left and all its leaders were in custody. EAM/ELAS which controlled much of the countryside and expected to take over when they realized that Stalin had conceded Greece to the British at Yalta. They believed it essential to seize control of the capital and create "facts on the ground." EAM/ELAS heavily outnumbered and outgunned government forces and came with a hair's breadth of success. Churchill moved quickly to transfer two British divisions from Italy and after a month of fighting decisively defeated the Greek communists. 

The referendum took place, after EAM/ELAS had been defeated in the Dekemvriana. Although they had agreed to disarm in the Treaty of Varkiza, in January 1945, they surrendered only a few token weapons and withdrew into the mountainous areas of Greece where they had effective control. In retaliation for the Red Terror, right-wing groups, often with the tacit support of the security forces, persecuted communists in areas not under communist control – the White Terror. This deepened the gulf between the Left and the centrist and right-wing parties, and polarized the political spectrum so that the centrist parties (that followed a more moderate but also more ambiguous policy) lost part of their power. The KKE boycotted both the elections and the referendum and instead launched the second phase of the civil war. They prevented any voting in areas they controlled. George II symbolized the unity of the anti-communist forces, which partly explains the percentage of votes in his favour. The conservatives, along with Prime Minister Konstantinos Tsaldaris, supported him, whereas the centrists were divided. While the centrists regarded George II with displeasure, they reacted with disgust at the savagery of the communists.

The official report of the Allied Mission to Observe the Greek Elections [AMFOGE] acknowledged the existence of voter fraud, despite its vested interest in legitimizing the election, that "There is no doubt in our minds that the party representing the government view exercised undue influence in securing votes in support of the return of the King." They however claimed that without said influence, the monarchy would still have prevailed in the election.

Results

References

Referendums in Greece
1946 referendums
1946 in Greece
Greek Civil War
Monarchism in Greece
1940s in Greek politics
Monarchy referendums
September 1946 events in Europe